Thryssocypris wongrati is a species of cyprinid of the genus Thryssocypris. It inhabits the Chao Phraya River and irrigation canals in its basin in Thailand. Described by Grudpan & Grudpan in 2012, it has not been evaluated on the IUCN Red List as of July 2021. It is considered harmless to humans.

References

Cyprinid fish of Asia
Fish of Thailand
Fish described in 2012